This is a list of sovereign states that existed between 3000 BC and 2001 BC.

Sovereign states

Sovereign states